Judith Tonhauser is a Professor of English Linguistics at the University of Stuttgart.

Education and career
Tonhauser received her Ph.D. in Linguistics from Stanford University in 2006. Her dissertation was titled The Temporal Semantics of Noun Phrases: Evidence from Guaraní. From 2006 to 2020, she was on the faculty of the Linguistics department at The Ohio State University. Since 2020 she has been Professor and Chair of English Linguistics at the University of Stuttgart.

Tonhauser's research interests include Presupposition projection, Prosody and Meaning, Temporal Anaphora and Reference, and empirical methods in Semantics and Pragmatics. She is known for her work in theoretical semantics and pragmatics, specifically on cross-linguistic semantic/pragmatic variation. To this end, she has investigated languages which are under-represented in linguistic theory like the Paraguayan Guarani language, a Tupí Guaraní language spoken in Paraguay and surrounding countries.

Awards and distinctions
Tonhauser is the recipient of the 2016 Early Career Award from the Linguistic Society of America. The award recognizes scholars early in their career who have made outstanding contributions to the field of linguistics.

Tonhauser's 2013 paper, "Toward a taxonomy of projective content," coauthored with David Beaver, Craige Roberts, and Mandy Simons, won the 2013 Best Paper in Language (journal) Award from the Linguistic Society of America.

In 2013, she was awarded an ACLS Frederick Burkhardt Residential Fellowship for Recently Tenured Scholars for her project Content and Context in the Study of Meaning Variation.

She is an Associate Editor of Semantics and Pragmatics, a journal of the Linguistic Society of America.

Selected publications

References 

Living people
Linguists from the United States
Women linguists
Semanticists
Ohio State University faculty
Stanford University alumni
Place of birth missing (living people)
Year of birth missing (living people)
Academic staff of the University of Stuttgart